SADELCA Ltda. (Spanish: Sociedad Aérea Del Caquetá) is a cargo airline based at El Dorado International Airport in Bogotá, Colombia.

Fleet

Current fleet

As of September 2020, the SADELCA fleet includes:

1 Antonov An-26B-100
1 Antonov An-32B
1 Douglas DC-3D

Former fleet
SADELCA formerly operated the following aircraft:

 Douglas C-47 Skytrain
 Douglas C-54 Skymaster
 Douglas DC-3C
 Douglas DC-4

Accidents and incidents
 On January 27, 1978, Douglas DC-3D HK-1351 crashed into a mountain at Cerro Granada, Caquetá, Colombia, killing all twelve people on board. The aircraft was on a scheduled passenger flight.

 On August 11, 1981, a Douglas DC-4 (HK-136) had to make an emergency landing on the flight from Florencia to Neiva. The machine was damaged beyond repair. No one was harmed.

References

External links

Airlines of Colombia
Cargo airlines
Airlines established in 1974